Clayton is an unincorporated community in Berks County, Pennsylvania, United States. Clayton is located at the intersection of Pennsylvania Route 100, Church Hill Road, and Kutztown Road on the border of Hereford and Washington townships.

References

Unincorporated communities in Berks County, Pennsylvania
Unincorporated communities in Pennsylvania